Shahid Bahonar may refer to the following, named after Iranian prime minister Mohammad-Javad Bahonar assassinated in the 1981 Iranian Prime Minister's office bombing:
Shahid Bahonar, Ilam
Shahid Bahonar, Ramhormoz, Khuzestan Province
Shahid Bahonar, Shush, Khuzestan Province
Shahid Bahonar, Lorestan
Shahid Bahonar Stadium
Shahid Bahonar University of Kerman

See also
Bahonar (disambiguation)